The 1931–32 Panhellenic Championship was the fourth season of the highest football league of Greece. Aris won their 2nd championship. On the other hand, AEK Athens, Olympiacos and PAOK qualified for the relegation play-offs for the Athenian, Piraeus' and Macedonian Association, respectively. AEK and Olympiacos prevailed in the play-off matches and remained in the national division. On the contrary, PAOK did not take part in the play-off matches against Megas Alexandros, which were scheduled for September 18 and 22, 1932, protesting against the decision of the HFF, which was issued on July 22, 1932, while PAOK had ended his league games, canceling his 3–2 win over Iraklis on June 5, 1932, following the objection of Iraklis for the referee that kept only 1 minute stoppage time due to entrance of the club's men on the pitch and the police intervention  to restore order. The match was scheduled to be repeated at the neutral stadium of AEK in Athens on September 11. PAOK did not appear in the match and Iraklis was declared the winner without a match by the decision of the HFF, overtaking PAOK in the standings. PAOK was then appointed by the HFF to give double qualifying matches with the then champion of Macedonia Megas Alexandros, however it did not show up again in either of the two matches, as a result of which it lost both games without a match. Thus, PAOK were relegated to the regional championship of Macedonia for the first time in its history. 

It was held as a national division, in which 8 teams from the 3 founding Associations of the HFF, participated and resulted as follows:
Athenian Championship: The first 3 teams of the 1930–31 ranking.
Piraeus' Championship: The first 2 teams of the 1930–31 ranking.
Macedonian Championship: The first 3 teams of the 1930–31 ranking.
These teams did not participate in the regional championships and their stay in the national division was judged by a play-off round. According to the regulations of the time, whoever finished in a lower position than the other teams of the same Association had to play a two-legged round against the winner of the corresponding regional championship to decide who will qualify for the 1932–33 Panhellenic Championship.
 
The point system was: Win: 2 points - Draw: 1 point - Loss: 0 points.

League table

Results

Relegation play-offs

|+

|}

 a.  PAOK refused to participate to the relegation play-offs as a protest to the decision of HFF to cancel the 3–2 win over Iraklis that would have PAOK qualified directly to the next season's championship. As a result, PAOK did not show up for any of the matches and both were awarded 2–0 to Megas Alexandros.

Top scorers

References

External links
Rsssf 1931–32 championship

Panhellenic Championship seasons
Greece
1931–32 in Greek football